Calliostoma purpureum is a species of sea snail, a marine gastropod mollusk in the family Calliostomatidae.

Description

Distribution
This species occurs in the Caribbean Sea, off Trinidad and off the Bahamas.

References

 Quinn, J. F. Jr. 1992. New species of Calliostoma Swainson, 1840 (Gastropoda: Trochidae), and notes on some poorly known species from the Western Atlantic Ocean. Nautilus 106: 77-114

External links
 To Biodiversity Heritage Library (1 publication)
 To Encyclopedia of Life
 To USNM Invertebrate Zoology Mollusca Collection
 To World Register of Marine Species
 

purpureum
Gastropods described in 1992